Mazama Lakes are twin glacial lakes located in Whatcom County, Washington near Mount Baker. They are a popular area for hiking.

See also 
 Mount Baker-Snoqualmie National Forest
 Iceberg Lake, Whatcom County, Washington

References

External links
Lakes Loop Trail
Chain Lakes Trail #682

Lakes of Washington (state)
Lakes of Whatcom County, Washington